The Roman Catholic Diocese of Cabanatuan (Latin: Dioecesis Cabanatuanensis) is a diocese of the Roman Catholic Church in the Philippines. The diocese comprises 16 towns of Nueva Ecija including the cities of Cabanatuan, Palayan, and Gapan. The diocese is a suffragan of the Archdiocese of Lingayen-Dagupan.

History 
On February 16, 1963 Pope John XXIII, issued the Apostolic Letter "Exterior Ecclesiae" creating the Diocese of Cabanatuan in Nueva Ecija separating from the Archdiocese of Lingayen-Dagupan, and then the Diocese of San Fernando. On June 3, 1963 the Diocese of Cabanatuan was canonically erected after that on June 4, 1963 Bishop Mariano Gaviola, D.D., was ordained and installed as the First Bishop of Cabanatuan. The Diocese of Cabanatuan was put under the patronage of St. Nicholas of Tolentino and the Virgin Mary under the title Divine Shepherdess (Divina Pastora) which is popularly venerated in Gapan every May 1. The seat of the diocese is the St. Nicholas of Tolentino Cathedral in Cabanatuan with a feast day of September 10.

The diocese lost territory in 1984 when the Diocese of San Jose in the Northern Part of Nueva Ecija was formed.

The current bishop of the diocese is Most Rev. Sofronio Aguirre Bancud, SSS, DD. He was appointed as auxiliary bishop on 2004 and installed as bishop on January 25, 2005.

Ordinaries

Gallery of the Diocese of Cabanatuan

See also
Catholic Church in the Philippines
List of Catholic dioceses in the Philippines

References

External links

Website of the Diocese of Cabanatuan
Maria Assumpta Seminary

Cabanatuan
Cabanatuan
Christian organizations established in 1963
Roman Catholic dioceses and prelatures established in the 20th century
Religion in Nueva Ecija
Cabanatuan